Rue Lepic is a street in the former commune of Montmartre, in the 18th arrondissement of Paris, climbing the hill of Montmartre from the Boulevard de Clichy to Place Jean-Baptiste-Clément.

It is an ancient road resulting of the rectification and re-arrangement of several dirt-roads leading to the Blanche barrier (Place Blanche), starting life as the Chemin-neuf (the Chemin-vieux was the Rue de Ravignan). In 1852 it was renamed Rue de l'Empereur, before it was renamed again in 1864, after General Louis Lepic (1765–1827).

Notable addresses 
 At n°15, brasserie Café des 2 Moulins where the film Amélie was set.
 At n°25, in 1910, the cabaret La Vache Enragée was based here.
 At n°50, poet Jehan Rictus lived at this address for over a decade.
 At n°53, resided Jean-Baptiste Clément (singer and prominent in Paris Commune) from 1880 to 1891. He then moved to n°112.
 At n°54, lived Van Gogh and his brother Théo, on the third floor, from 1886 to 1888; Art dealer Alphonse Portier, lived on the first floor for several years - Armand Guillaumin had consigned some of his paintings to him in 1887.
 At n°56, the Vandoren clarinet and saxophone reed manufacturer. Their premium reed brand is named after this address.
 At n°59, from 1873-1891, lived the painter , in a house with an extensive garden; also lived the painter Charles Léandre, in 1910; former site of Moulin de la Fontaine-Saint-Denis.
 At n°64, once lived satirical cartoonist Forain in 1875.
 At n°65, adjacent to avenue Junot, is site of the Moulin-Neuf (1741).
 At n°72, former workshop of Félix Ziem.
 At n°73, site of the Moulin-Vieux, which was demolished in 1860.
 At n°77, Moulin de la Galette and Moulin le Radet.
 At n°85 to 87, Moulin de la Petite-Tour construction dating from 1647.
 At n°87, once lived Willette.
 At n°89 to 93, Moulin de la Vieille-Tour, built in 1623.
 At n°95 to 99, site of the Moulin-du-Palais, built in 1640.
 At n°98, Louis-Ferdinand Céline resided.
 At n°100, Austrian doctor David Gruby built an observatory on the roof of the building in 1860.
 Au n°102, rough site of Moulin de la Grande-Tour, a tower constructed in stone which was taken down before the French Revolution.
 At n°112, resided Jean-Baptiste Clément in 1891.

In history 
Painter and engraver Eugène Delâtre lived and worked on rue Lepic. He successively occupied addresses n°92, n°87, n°97, and also n°102.

Louis Renault built his first car in 1898, calling his car the Voiturette. On December 24, 1898, he won a bet with his friends that his invention was capable of driving up the slope of Rue Lepic. As well as winning the bet, Renault received 12 definite orders for the vehicle.

On 7 September 1960, Fernand and Jackie Sardou opened their cabaret Chez Fernand Sardou on the road in place of cabaret Belzébuth next to the residence of Utrillo. The cabaret became a preferred meeting place and played to a full house every night. Michel Sardou had his professional début there, firstly as a server.

In the Claude Autant-Lara film, La Traversée de Paris (1956), "Martin" (played by André Bourvil) et "Grandgil" (played by Jean Gabin) were pictured in this road during the German occupation of France transporting a jointed pig destined for the black market.

Yves Montand dedicated to this road the song  "Rue Lepic" in the album Yves Montand (1974).

Sources and references

 Dictionnaire historique des rues de Paris
 Paris Guide 1807 - Librairie Internationale

Streets in the 18th arrondissement of Paris